Supersize is a phrase that means “to sizably increase the amount or the extent of something”.

The phrase was particularly used by McDonald's restaurants to upsize their French fries and soft drinks to an extra-large size. In the United States, McDonald's introduced the supersized option in the summer of 1987. 

For Disney’s 1988 film “Who Framed Roger Rabbit,” instead of running a Happy Meal promotion targeted at children, they opted for a “super-size” promotion, “designed to appeal to teen-agers and young adults, the same as the movie's audience.”  The same held true for 1993 Steven Spielberg film “Jurassic Park”, when McDonald’s introduced Dino-Sized drink and fry options. 

In March 2004, McDonald's announced a plan to phase out the Supersize option, citing needs to simplify the menu and to offer healthier food choices.

See also
Upselling

References

McDonald's